Ramaria pallida is a coral mushroom in the family Gomphaceae. It is found in North America.

References

Gomphaceae
Fungi described in 1920
Fungi of North America
Taxa named by Jacob Christian Schäffer